George H. Eldridge (May 12, 1844 – November 20, 1918) was an American soldier in the U.S. Army who served with the 24th Michigan Volunteer Infantry in the American Civil War and the 6th U.S. Cavalry during the Texas–Indian Wars. He received the Medal of Honor for gallantry fighting the Kiowa Indians and Chief Kicking Bird at the Battle of the Little Wichita River on July 12, 1870.

Biography
George H. Eldridge was born in Sackets Harbor, New York on May 12, 1844. He later moved to Michigan where, at the start of the American Civil War, he joined the 24th Michigan Volunteer Infantry which along with the 2nd, 6th and 7th Wisconsin Volunteer Infantry regiments, would form the "Iron Brigade" of the Army of the Potomac. Eldridge returned to military service years later when he enlisted in the U.S. Army in Detroit and was assigned to the 6th U.S. Cavalry. He took part in campaigns against the Plains Indians during the Texas-Indian Wars, most notably, against the Kiowa in the late-1860s. On July 6, 1870, he was among the cavalrymen under Captain Curwen B. McClelland who left Fort Richardson (near Jacksboro, Texas) to pursue renegade Indians who had seized mail from nearby Rock Station. After a 5-day chase, McClelland's force was ambushed at Wichita River by a force of 250 warriors under Chief Kicking Bird resulting in the Battle of the Little Wichita River. Despite being outnumbered and outgunned, the cavalry troopers managed to force the Kiowas to retreat after heavy fighting. After returning to Fort Richardson, Eldridge and 12 other soldiers were received the Medal of Honor for "gallantry in action" on August 25, 1870. He died in Los Angeles, California on November 20, 1918, and was interred at the Los Angeles National Cemetery.

Medal of Honor citation
Rank and organization: Sergeant, Company C, 6th U.S. Cavalry. Place and date: At Wichita River, Tex., July 12, 1870. Entered service at: ------. Birth: Sacketts Harbor, N.Y. Date of issue: August 25, 1870.

Citation:

Gallantry in action.

See also

List of Medal of Honor recipients for the Indian Wars

References

Further reading

Konstantin, Phil. This Day in North American Indian History: Important Dates in the History of North America's Native Peoples for Every Calendar Day. New York: Da Capo Press, 2002. 
Neal, Charles M. Valor Across the Lone Star: The Congressional Medal of Honor in Frontier Texas. Austin: Texas State Historical Association, 2003.

External links

1844 births
1918 deaths
Union Army soldiers
American military personnel of the Indian Wars
United States Army Medal of Honor recipients
People from Sackets Harbor, New York
People from Los Angeles
United States Army soldiers
American Indian Wars recipients of the Medal of Honor
Burials at Los Angeles National Cemetery
People of Michigan in the American Civil War